Following is a  List of high school athletic conferences in Missouri:
Archdiocesan Athletic Association
ABC Conference (Missouri)
Big 8 Conference (Missouri)
Big Springs Conference
Black River League
Bootheel Conference
Carroll-Livingston Activity Association
Central Activities Conference
Central Ozark Conference
Clarence Cannon Conference
Cooper County Activities Association
Crossroads Conference
Eastern Missouri Conference
Four Rivers Conference
Frisco League
Gasconade Valley Conference
Gateway Athletic Conference
Golden Valley Vernon County Conference
Grand River Conference
HDC Conference
Highway 275 Conference
I-70 Conference
Interscholastic League of Kansas City
Independent high schools (Missouri)
Jefferson County Conference
Kansas City Interscholastic Conference
Kaysinger Conference
Mark Twain Conference
Lewis & Clark Conference
Mississippi Area Football Conference
Metro Catholic Conference
Mid-Missouri Conference
Midland Empire Conference
Mid-Lakes Conference
Missouri River Valley Conference
North Central Missouri Conference
Ozark Conference
Ozark Foothills Conference 
Ozark Highlands Conference 
Ozark 7 Conference
Public High League
Platte Valley Conference
Polk County League
Scott-Mississippi Conference
Show-Me Conference
Southeast Missouri Conference
South Central Conference (Missouri)
SouthWest Central League
Spring River Valley Conference
Stoddard County Activities Association
Suburban Conference (Kansas City)
Suburban Conference (St. Louis)
Tri-County Conference (Central Missouri)
Tri-County Conference (Northern Missouri)
Tri-Rivers Conference
West Central Conference (Missouri)
Western Missouri Conference
White River Conference

References